Rimantas Klivečka known as Ray Klivecka in the United States is a Lithuanian-American former soccer player and coach. He is best known for managing the New York Cosmos.

College career 
Klivecka played for Long Island University from 1961 to 1963. He was a two-time All-American and ended his college career as LIU's all-time leading goal scorer with 55 goals. His 23 goals in the 1963 season led LIU to its first ever NCAA Tournament appearance. He was inducted to the LIU Hall of Fame in 2000.

Coaching career 
After serving as a United States youth team coach, Klivecka spent the 1978 and 1979 seasons with the New York Cosmos as an assistant coach under head coach Eddie Firmani. When Firmani was fired in 1979, Klivecka took over for the remainder of the Cosmos' North American Soccer League  campaign. The Cosmos finished in first place with a 24-6 record, but Klivecka was dismissed at the end of the season after suffering a loss to the Vancouver Whitecaps in the semifinals.

1979-80 he was a co-owner of the then Major Indoor Soccer League expansion franchise St. Louis Steamers.

In 1980 he also was head coach and general manager for seven matches of the NASL-Franchise Rochester Lancers which quit after that season.

Klivecka took over as head coach of the Buffalo Stallions of Major Indoor Soccer League for the 1980 and 1981 seasons, compiling a 39-30 record and leading the club to the playoffs in both seasons. 

Due in part to his success with Buffalo, in the early days of December 1984 Klivecka was re-hired as head coach of the New York Cosmos, now playing indoor soccer in the MISL, for the 1984 season, where he stayed until the bitter end in mid 1985. Later he ended up suing the cosmos for $ 100,000.

In 1986 he was shortlived coach of the indoor expansion franchise New York Express. President and ex-Cosmos goalkeeper Shep Messing fired him after a 0-10 season start record.

References
 Ray Klivecka on Just Sports Stats

1941 births
Footballers from Vilnius
Association football forwards
Living people
Lithuanian footballers
Lithuanian expatriate footballers
Lithuanian football managers
Lithuanian expatriate football managers
Lithuanian expatriate sportspeople in the United States
Expatriate soccer players in the United States
Expatriate soccer managers in the United States
American soccer coaches
Major Indoor Soccer League (1978–1992) commentators
Major Indoor Soccer League (1978–1992) coaches
North American Soccer League (1968–1984) coaches